Kevin Francis Conolly (born 31 December 1958), an Australian politician, is a member of the New South Wales Legislative Assembly representing Riverstone for the Liberal Party since 2011.

Early years and background
Conolly graduated with a Bachelor of Arts from the University of New South Wales, and was later awarded a Diploma of Education and Graduate Diploma of Religious Education from the Council for Christian Education in Schools. Conolly subsequently graduated with a Graduate Diploma in Education (Administration) from the Australian Catholic University. He worked for the Catholic Education Office in the Diocese of Parramatta before entering state politics.

Political career
In September 1999, he was elected to the Hawkesbury City Council. From 2001 to 2004 he served as deputy mayor, while still working as a teaching administrator. Conolly contested the 1999 state election, but was unsuccessful in winning the seat of Londonderry for the Liberal Party.

In 2007 and again in 2011, Conolly contested the normally safe Labor seat of Riverstone in north-western Sydney. In March 2011, Conolly was elected with a two-party swing of 30.2 points—almost unheard of in Australian politics.  He ultimately won the seat with 70.2 per cent of the vote, turning it into a comfortably safe Liberal seat in one stroke.  His primary-vote margin was actually enough for him to take the seat without the need for preferences. It was the first time in the seat's 30-year history that the seat was not held by Labor. Before the election, the sitting member, John Aquilina, who had held the seat since 1991, announced his retirement.

Policy Positions

Abortion 
Conolly opposed the Abortion Law Reform Act 2019, describing it as "capital punishment for being unwanted" and "a fascist solution in search of a problem". Along with Mulgoa MP Tanya Davies, Conolly threatened to move to the crossbench unless certain amendments were passed, stripping the Liberal Party of their majority.

Same-Sex Marriage 
Conolly opposes same-sex marriage, declaring in a 2015 statement that "marriage existed before parliaments and government" and that it was a "relationship that reflects the laws of nature".

References

External links
 Official Website of Kevin Conolly, MP for Riverstone

Liberal Party of Australia members of the Parliament of New South Wales
Members of the New South Wales Legislative Assembly
Living people
1958 births
City of Hawkesbury
Australian schoolteachers
Australian Roman Catholics
University of New South Wales alumni
21st-century Australian politicians